Felix Hess (20 June 1878 – 9 April 1943) was a Dutch painter. He studied at Rijksakademie van beeldende kunsten in Amsterdam. His teachers included . His work was part of the painting event in the art competition at the 1928 Summer Olympics. His work was included in the 1939 exhibition and sale Onze Kunst van Heden (Our Art of Today) at the Rijksmuseum in Amsterdam.

Hess was killed in the Sobibor extermination camp during World War II.

References

1878 births
1943 deaths
20th-century Dutch painters
Dutch male painters
Olympic competitors in art competitions
Painters from Amsterdam
Dutch people who died in Sobibor extermination camp
20th-century Dutch male artists